The Qi River is a left-bank tributary of the middle Xiang River, one of main tributaries of the Xiang in Hunan Province. It rises in the Simin Mountains of Qidong County. Its main stream runs generally northwest to southeast through Shaoyang, Qidong and Qiyang counties, and it joins the Xiang in the west of Shuifumiao of Qiyang.

References

Rivers of Hunan